The 1982 Houston Cougars football team represented the University of Houston during the 1982 NCAA Division I-A football season. The Cougars were led by 21st-year head coach Bill Yeoman and played their home games at the Astrodome in Houston, Texas. The team competed as members of the Southwest Conference, finishing in fourth. Houston was not invited to a bowl game for the first time since 1977, finishing the season with a 5–5–1 record.

Schedule

Source:

References

Houston
Houston Cougars football seasons
Houston Cougars football